Helsinki Book Fair is an annual trade fair for books held since 2001. It is held in October in Helsinki Exhibition and Convention Centre in Helsinki, Finland.

External links
 Book, the Helsinki Book Fair Magazine, Media Card
 Home page, Helsinki Book Fair

Recurring events established in 2001
2001 establishments in Finland
Book fairs in Finland
Autumn events in Finland
Events in Helsinki